Socialist Appeal may refer to:

Socialist Appeal (UK, 1992), British Trotskyist organization founded in 1992, affiliated with the International Marxist Tendency
Socialist Appeal journal of International Marxist Tendency, a fortnightly publication
Socialist Appeal (US, 1935), a newspaper published from 1935 to 1941, first by the Trotskyist faction in the Socialist Party of America and later by the Socialist Workers Party
Socialist Appeal, the journal of the Revolutionary Communist Party (UK, 1944), a British Trotskyist organisation that existed from 1944 to 1949